Northwoods is a city in St. Louis County, Missouri, United States. The population was 4,227 at the 2010 census.

Geography
Northwoods is located at  (38.703251, -90.282337).

Demographics

2010 census
As of the census of 2010, there were 4,227 people, 1,651 households, and 1,126 families living in the city. The racial makeup of the city was 4.3% White, 93.9% African American, 0.2% Native American, 0.3% Asian, 0.1% from other races, and 1.2% from two or more races. Hispanic or Latino of any race were 0.2% of the population.

There were 1,651 households, of which 31.4% had children under the age of 18 living with them, 30.0% were married couples living together, 32.8% had a female householder with no husband present, 5.4% had a male householder with no wife present, and 31.8% were non-families. 28.0% of all households were made up of individuals, and 12.3% had someone living alone who was 65 years of age or older. The average household size was 2.51 and the average family size was 3.04.

The median age in the city was 42.7 years. 22.6% of residents were under the age of 18; 8.1% were between the ages of 18 and 24; 21.5% were from 25 to 44; 27.7% were from 45 to 64; and 20.1% were 65 years of age or older. The gender makeup of the city was 43.1% male and 56.9% female.

2000 census
As of the census of 2000, there were 4,643 people, 1,718 households, and 1,262 families living in the city. The racial makeup of the city was 6.25% White, 92.66% African American, 0.04% Native American, 0.13% Asian, 0.11% from other races, and 0.82% from two or more races. Hispanic or Latino of any race were 0.22% of the population.

There were 1,718 households, out of which 25.7% had children under the age of 18 living with them, 39.0% were married couples living together, 28.8% had a female householder with no husband present, and 26.5% were non-families. 23.7% of all households were made up of individuals, and 8.3% had someone living alone who was 65 years of age or older. The average household size was 2.63 and the average family size was 3.09.

In the city, the population was spread out, with 24.1% under the age of 18, 8.1% from 18 to 24, 24.1% from 25 to 44, 28.2% from 45 to 64, and 15.6% who were 65 years of age or older. The median age was 40 years. For every 100 females, there were 78.9 males. For every 100 females age 18 and over, there were 73.0 males.

The median income for a household in the city was $37,938, and the median income for a family was $42,475. Males had a median income of $28,953 versus $27,334 for females. The per capita income for the city was $19,803. About 8.3% of families and 10.2% of the population were below the poverty line, including 13.3% of those under age 18 and 4.0% of those age 65 or over.

References

Cities in St. Louis County, Missouri
Cities in Missouri